The Para-Ski Top Gun is a Canadian powered parachute that was designed and produced by Para-Ski of Mascouche, Quebec. Now out of production, when it was available the aircraft was supplied as a complete ready-to-fly-aircraft and also as a kit for amateur construction.

The Top Gun was introduced in 2003 and production ended when the company went out of business in about 2011.

Design and development
The Top Gun was designed to comply with the Canadian Basic Ultralight Aeroplane category, as well as the Fédération Aéronautique Internationale microlight category. In kit form the aircraft was designed to comply with the Canadian Amateur-built Aircraft rules as well as the US Experimental - Amateur-built aircraft rules. It features a  parachute-style wing, two-seats-in-tandem accommodation, four-wheeled landing gear and a single  Rotax 582 engine in pusher configuration. The  Hirth 3203, the  Hirth F-30 or  Hirth F-30ES engines were factory options. Landing gear options include skis and floats.

The aircraft carriage is built from welded aluminium tubing and has a "sledge-like" cockpit fairing incorporating dual square headlights. In flight steering is accomplished via handle bars that actuate the canopy brakes, creating roll and yaw. On the ground the aircraft has front wheel steering. The aircraft uses a large rudder to offset the engine torque effects. The landing gear incorporates independent shock and spring suspension.

Operational history
In July 2015 three examples were registered with the Transport Canada.

Variants
Top Gun
Base model
Top Gun Discovery
Model including some options as standard

Specifications (Top Gun Discovery)

References

External links
Aircraft website archives on Archive.org
Photo of a Top Gun landing

Top Gun
2000s Canadian sport aircraft
2000s Canadian ultralight aircraft
Single-engined pusher aircraft
Powered parachutes